The Valley of Hunted Men is a 1928 American silent Western film directed by Richard Thorpe and starring Jay Wilsey, Oscar Apfel and Kathleen Collins.

Cast
 Jay Wilsey as Tom Mallory 
 Oscar Apfel as Dan Phillips 
 Kathleen Collins as Betty Phillips 
 Jack Ganzhorn as 'Frenchy' Durant 
 Alma Rayford as Valita 
 Frank Griffith as 'Yucca' Jake 
 Frank Ellis as Henchman
 Adrienne Dore (uncredited)

References

Bibliography
 Langman, Larry. A Guide to Silent Westerns. Greenwood Publishing Group, 1992.

External links
 

1928 films
1928 Western (genre) films
1920s English-language films
Films directed by Richard Thorpe
American black-and-white films
Pathé Exchange films
Silent American Western (genre) films
1920s American films